Two regiments of the British Army have been numbered the 122nd Regiment of Foot:

122nd Regiment of Foot (1762), raised in 1762
122nd Regiment of Foot (1794), raised in 1794